Splashdown is a log flume located at Castles N' Coasters, a theme park in Phoenix, Arizona. It is noted for its two drops, as well as many other special features. The whole ride is themed after a logging expedition through Polynesia. Splashdown is also known for narrowly being dodged by the nearby Desert Storm roller coaster.

Theme and experience
At the beginning of the ride, the "logs" disembark through a "logging town" with buildings such as banks or other stores. The logs then approach a tunnel. This tunnel has waterfalls and small geysers decorating the outside. The tunnel and ride narrowly turn and climb the first, smaller hill. After sliding down, the logs pass two realistic sculptures of African elephants that squirt water just above riders' heads. While turning again, the logs pass a Polynesian village, small gardens, and fountains. Eventually, the logs go up largest, most  notable hill, does a U-turn and takes its plunge, does yet another U-turn, and returns to the boarding dock.

Features
 Two hills, each with separate lifts
 Tunnel
 "Logging Town"
 "Polynesian Village"
 Fountains, geysers, and waterfalls
 Squirting African elephant sculptures
 Small gardens

Incidents 

On November 27, 2015, a 12-year-old boy fell from the log flume and struck his head during the fall.

See also
 Castles N' Coasters
 Desert Storm (roller coaster)
 Log flume (attraction)

References

 Castles N' Coasters Official Website
 Castles N' Coasters Park Map

Buildings and structures in Phoenix, Arizona
Amusement rides introduced in 1991
1991 establishments in Arizona